Huddersfield Town's 2000–01 campaign was their last competitive campaign in the second tier of English football, up until Town's return in the 2012–13 season. Huddersfield finished 22nd following a disastrous final day in which Town lost at home to Birmingham City, while their rivals Stockport County, Portsmouth & Crystal Palace all got their necessary results which sent Town down.

Squad at the start of the season

Review
The optimism that had surrounded the club just a year earlier had completely dissipated and manager Bruce's ability to turn the tide was seriously in doubt given the side's finish to the previous season. After some less than inspiring signings, among them Kevin Gallen, Huddersfield made a horrific start to the season, winning only one of their first 19 games, (a 3–2 win over Sheffield Wednesday at Hillsborough Stadium) which saw Steve Bruce lose his job in October after Town went to the bottom of the table following a 1–0 loss to Grimsby Town. Lou Macari, the former Stoke City, Birmingham City, West Ham United and Celtic manager, took over immediately, but results didn't improve. Then in December, a miracle occurred, the loan signing of Zimbabwean international Peter Ndlovu dramatically improved Town's fortunes. They won five out of seven games in December and drew the other two, which brought Macari the Manager of the Month award for December 2000 and helped push the Terriers out of the bottom three. Many thought that a repeat of "The Great Escape" three seasons ago was on the cards again.

However, Town's old manager Warnock (Crystal Palace) snapped Ndlovu up before a permanent deal could be agreed. Then a run of seven games without a win in January and February saw Town slide into trouble again, but Macari pulled a joker from the pack and signed the irreplaceable legend Andy Booth for £200,000 from Sheffield Wednesday. He scored on his debut in a 4–1 win against Portsmouth, but following defeats to promotion chasing Fulham and Blackburn Rovers, Town were in trouble again.

Their next game was against Queens Park Rangers. The Terriers won the game 2–1, which saw QPR relegated along with Tranmere Rovers, but then draws against Wimbledon and West Bromwich Albion saw Town in trouble on the final day. Town needed a win to guarantee 1st Division football, but a disputed goal for Crystal Palace combined with Town's 2–1 defeat by Birmingham City saw Town back down to Division 2.

Squad at the end of the season

Results

Division One

FA Cup

Worthington Cup

Appearances and goals

References

2000-01
Hudd